Sasha (Oleksandra) Masiuk also Sashatattooing (born 22 May 1990 in Kharkiv, USSR) is a tattoo artist with her own studios in Russia, Spain and the United States. Oleksandra is known for her dotwork tattoo technique combined with the usage of floral motives and mandalas.

Biography and art 
Oleksandra was born in Kharkiv, Ukraine in 1990. She graduated from the Kharkiv Academy of Design and Arts in 2011. The same year Sasha moved to Saint Petersburg where she worked as an illustrator until she tried herself in tattoo art.

After developing a level of skill, Sasha started working in a tattoo studio Baraka. In 2013 Sasha opened her first workspace in Saint Petersburg. In 2014 Sasha managed to open a studio in Moscow.

In 2015 Sasha and her husband moved to Berlin, Germany. In the following years the couple opened Sashatattooing branded studios in Barcelona, Spain and Los Angeles, United States.

Clients and collaborations 
The client list includes: the singer from Maroon 5 Adam Levine, Victoria's Secret model Behati Prinsloo, football player Axel Witsel, football players from the Zenit football club and a Russian singer Sergey Zhukov.

In 2015, Sasha started performing collaborations with clothing brands Bats and Designed for Fitness.

In 2016 Sasha collaborated with Reebok to create designs for Reebok Classic NPC: a mandala and Sasha’s signature were "tattooed" on the white leather shoe.

In 2019 the collaboration between the French brand Black Alchemy and Sashatattooing carried out the line of accessories designed by Sasha.

In 2020, Sashatattooing collaborated with Google ATAP. 

Sashatattooing was the brand ambassador for S7 airlines and L'Oréal in Russia and YSL, Urban Decay in the US.

References

External links 
 
 Sashatattooing's Instagram page

Tattoo artists
1990 births
Living people
Ukrainian artists